David Hale may refer to:

People 
 David Hale (American football) (born 1983), American retired National Football League player
 David Hale (Australian cricketer) (born 1941), Australian cricketer
 David Hale (baseball) (born 1987), American baseball pitcher
 David Hale (diplomat) (born 1962), American diplomat, currently the United States Under Secretary of State for Political Affairs
 David Hale (economist) (born 1951), American economist
 David Hale (English cricketer) (born 1966), English former cricketer
 David Hale (footballer) (born 1984), Australian rules footballer
 David Hale (general) (born c. 1946), American retired general, court-martialed for sexual misconduct
 David Hale (ice hockey) (born 1981), American retired National Hockey League player
 David Hale (Whitewater), former Arkansas municipal judge convicted of fraud, Whitewater trial witness
 David J. Hale (born 1967), United States federal judge, United States District Court for the Western District of Kentucky

Characters 
 David Hale (Sons of Anarchy), on the American TV series Sons of Anarchy